The Smart Card Open Monet+ was a tournament for professional female tennis players played on clay courts. The event was classified as a $25,000 ITF Women's Circuit tournament, but has had a larger prize fund in previous years. It was held in Zlín, Czech Republic, from 2007 to 2013.

Past finals

Singles

Doubles

External links 
 Official website 

ITF Women's World Tennis Tour
Clay court tennis tournaments
Tennis tournaments in the Czech Republic
Recurring sporting events established in 2007
Recurring sporting events disestablished in 2013
Defunct sports competitions in the Czech Republic